Jean Rouqueirol (19 April 1933 – 19 February 2014) was a French rugby league player.

Biography 
At club level, he first played for SO Avignon, along with his brothers Claude and Fernand. He later played for RC Roanne and then for Marseille XIII.  

Rouqueirol also represented France between 1955 and 1959, including at the 1957 Rugby League World Cup. 

After retiring as player, he became a coach, coaching SO Avignon, which won the Lord Derby Cup in 1982.

Honours 

 Rugby league:
 French Championship :
 Finalist in 1956 (SO Avignon)
 Lord Derby Cup:
 2 times champion: 1954 and 1955 (SO Avignon)
 2 times finalist: 1957 and 1958 (SO Avignon)

References

External links 

 Jean Rouqueirol at rugbyleagueproject.com

1933 births
2011 deaths
French rugby league players
Marseille XIII players
RC Roanne XIII players
Rugby league locks
Sporting Olympique Avignon coaches
Sporting Olympique Avignon players
Sportspeople from Gard
France national rugby league team players
French rugby league coaches